Jean-Damien Climonet (born 27 March 1969) is retired French freestyle skier who competed in the 1998 Winter Olympics in Nagano. The best result at the World Cup has reached championship in Iizuna, where he finished 6th in acrobatic jumps. He also finished his 16th place in the same event in Olympic Games in Nagano. In his best performance in the world cup has reached 1996/1997 season, when he reached in 12th place in the general classification and the classification of acrobatic jumps was second. In 1998 he ended his skiing career.

References

External links 
Jean Damien Climonet at the Sports Reference
Profile at the World Cup season standings - Jean Damien Climonet

1969 births
Living people
French male freestyle skiers
Olympic freestyle skiers of France
Freestyle skiers at the 1998 Winter Olympics
People from Lons-le-Saunier
Sportspeople from Jura (department)